Laurence W. Heisler  (born February 13, 1969) is a former professional baseball pitcher. Heisler played in the Philadelphia Phillies minor league system from 1992 to 1994. He participated in the 2004 Olympics, as a member of Greece's baseball team.

External links

1969 births
Baseball players at the 2004 Summer Olympics
Olympic baseball players of Greece
Greek baseball players
Living people
Batavia Clippers players
Clearwater Phillies players
Spartanburg Phillies players